Tachygyna vancouverana is a species of dwarf spider in the family Linyphiidae. It is found in the Pacific Northwest of North America.

References

Linyphiidae
Articles created by Qbugbot
Spiders described in 1939